Jessie Anne Douglas Montgomery (1851–1918), known as Jessie Montgomery, was an English educational administrator, activist and suffragette associated with women's formal education in the Exeter area.

Early life
Montgomery was born on 6 August 1851 in London to the Rev. Robert Montgomery (1807–1855) and his wife was Rachel Catherine Andrews McKenzie (1814−1882). On Robert's death, his widow and daughter moved to Exeter, where they lived in the Cathedral Close with Rachel's sister Jessie Barbara Cook (1811–1899) and her husband Rev. Frederic Charles Cook (1805–1889), Canon of Exeter Cathedral After her mother's death in 1882, Montgomery moved to a large house in Baring Crescent, Exeter.

Education career
Despite limited opportunities for her own education, Montgomery became an activist over several decades for women's education in the Exeter area. Having successfully completed several courses at the Exeter Museum Centre, she became joint secretary to the University Extension Centre, and convenor of the Ladies' Students' Association. She became a governor of the Royal Albert Memorial Museum College, which became the Royal Albert Memorial College, the forerunner of both the University College of the South-West and then the University of Exeter.

Suffragette
Montgomery inaugurated the Exeter Branch of the National Union of Women's Suffrage Societies, and became its first secretary (1909–1911). Despite her organisation, activism and public speaking for women's suffrage, she did not survive long enough to cast a vote.

Death and legacy
On 13 October 1918, Montgomery died in hospital in Southampton during an operation.

She is commemorated by a memorial in the Exeter Cathedral.

A house in the University of Exeter former Duryard Halls of Residence was named "Jessie Montgomery" in her honour.

References
 https://www.devonhistorysociety.org.uk/montgomery-miss-jessie/

People associated with the University of Exeter
People from London
Education activists
English suffragettes
1851 births
1918 deaths